Paripocregyes is a genus of longhorn beetles of the subfamily Lamiinae, containing the following species:

 Paripocregyes brunneomaculatus Breuning, 1938
 Paripocregyes fuscovittatus Breuning, 1938
 Paripocregyes terminaliae (Fisher, 1933)

References

Mesosini